The 2010 Wokingham Borough Council election took place on 6 May 2010 to elect members of Wokingham Unitary Council in Berkshire, England. One third of the council was up for election and the Conservative Party stayed in overall control of the council.

After the election, the composition of the council was:
Conservative 43
Liberal Democrat 11

Election result
The results saw the Conservatives stay in control of the council with 43 seats, but lose 1 seat to the Liberal Democrats who then had 11 councillors. Liberal Democrat Sue Smith gained Loddon from Conservative Abdul Loyes by 51 votes in the only change in the political composition of the council. This was the first time since the 2001 election that the Conservatives had failed to gain seats at an election for Wokingham council. Overall turnout in the election was 71.33%, significantly up after the council election was held at the same time as the general election.

Ward results

References

External links
Short bios of all the candidates at the election

2010 English local elections
May 2010 events in the United Kingdom
2010
2010s in Berkshire